Jeffrey Lavern McNeely (born October 18, 1969) is a former center fielder/designated hitter in Major League Baseball who played briefly for the Boston Red Sox during the 1993 season. Listed at 6' 2", 190 lb., McNeely batted and threw right-handed. He attended Spartanburg Methodist College.

In a season/career, McNeely was a .297 hitter (11-for-37) with 10 runs and six stolen bases in 21 games, including one double, one triple, one RBI, a .409 on-base percentage without home runs. In 13 outfield appearances, he collected a .917 fielding percentage (two errors in 24 chances).

From 1992 to 1996, McNeely also played in the minors with New Britain (1992), Pawtucket (1993–94), Louisville (1995–96). In 479 games, he hit .239 with eight home runs, 197 runs, 118 RBI, and 70 stolen bases.

McNeely runs Charlotte Megastars Baseball Club. He helped over 350 players receive a baseball scholarship.

Transactions
1989: Selected by the Boston Red Sox in the 2nd round of the 1989 draft.
1994: Traded by Boston along with Nate Minchey to the St. Louis Cardinals in exchange for Luis Alicea.

See also
Boston Red Sox all-time roster
1993 Boston Red Sox season

External links

1969 births
Living people
African-American baseball players
Boston Red Sox players
Pawtucket Red Sox players
Winter Haven Red Sox players
Major League Baseball center fielders
Major League Baseball designated hitters
Baseball players from North Carolina
People from Monroe, North Carolina
Spartanburg Methodist Pioneers baseball players
Elmira Pioneers players
Gulf Coast Red Sox players
Louisville Redbirds players
Lynchburg Red Sox players
Midland Angels players
New Britain Red Sox players
21st-century African-American people
20th-century African-American sportspeople